is a fictional character appearing in
the Ju-on film franchise and the husband of Kayako Saeki. Since his introduction up to The Grudge 3, he is portrayed by long-time veteran actor Takashi Matsuyama; he is the only Saeki family member not to be portrayed by multiple actors. However, Matsuyama was replaced by actor Yasuhito Hida for the 2014 Japanese reboot, Ju-on: Beginning of the End, and its sequel Ju-on: The Final Curse.

Character history
Takeo Saeki is an illustrator working in Nerima, Tokyo when he meets Kayako Kawamata. He falls in love and marries her, eventually fathering her child, Toshio.

As evidenced in the Ju-on novelization, Takeo Saeki is very possessive and jealous of anyone who steals Kayako's attention; when his wife says she likes a particular actor on TV, he gets very angry.

One day, he finds Kayako's diary and reads it. He is struck by uncontrollable rage when he learns that Kayako is in love with a man named Shunsuke Kobayashi, Toshio's school teacher and Kayako's first love back in college. He becomes obsessed with the idea that Kayako is cheating on him and Toshio is Kobayashi's child.

When Kayako gets home, Takeo attacks his wife, breaking her neck and slashing her with a box cutter, then hiding her body in the attic. As seen in the American remake of the first Ju-on movie, he drowns Toshio in the bathtub along with his beloved black cat Mar. Takeo runs to Kobayashi's apartment, kills his wife Manami, and takes her premature baby. He then calls Kobayashi by using the bloody phone booth, saying he would be leaving him to raise Toshio because he thought 'up until now, he had raised him in his place'. Then after hitting the dead female fetus around in a sack, he falls on some garbage bags, one of them actually heading towards him and containing Kayako's dead spirit who eventually kills him on that street.

From that day on, the Saeki house becomes an infamous landmark. Once anyone enters, they are either killed by the spirits of Takeo, Kayako or Toshio, or disappear within Kayako's clutches. Like with the other ghosts, none of the victims ever attempt to fight back physically, as they are usually paralyzed by fear.

In the 2014 reboot, Takeo is portrayed more sympathetically, as he was ultimately manipulated, both by feelings and trust, by Kayako, since Toshio really was not his son, but rather, an incarnation of a dead child from a previous family who inhabited the house. He still killed Kayako and Toshio, but did not become an onryo, as his fate afterward is not revealed.

In ‘’Ju-On: The Grudge’’ a news article reveals that Takeo was 34 at the time of his death, but in The Grudge films, according to a news article, he is 35 years old when he dies.

Differences between versions
In The Grudge, Takeo is instead hanged by the neck inside the house. It is implied that he hanged himself. However, in the Director's Cut version of the film, he is seen hanging by Kayako's hair, indicating that she was responsible for his death, thus making him the first victim of the curse.

In the Ju-on novel, his death differs once again - he is killed when Kayako's ghost stabs him in the back with a knife.

Timeline

Ju-on: The Curse
In this film, Takeo, ironically, is both the protagonist and antagonist simultaneously. This film is all about him as he was the source of the curse which was put on the Saeki House. In this film he discovers that his wife, Kayako was having an affair with his son's teacher, Shunsuke Kobayashi, and this is where his insanity begins, because he was already happily married to Kayako and he had a decent job and he had a son which he considered his and his alone. When he suddenly found Kayako's diary, he discovered that she fancied Kobayashi, and then Takeo's suspicions began to manifest themselves in the fear that Toshio might not be his son, but Kobayashi's. Just as he was reading the diary, however, things changed from bad to worse, because Kayako entered the room, having just returned home from college. She entered the room smiling, but her smile faded when she saw Takeo holding her diary. She suddenly realized that her secret was out and Takeo desired retribution. When he saw Kayako, whom he now perceived as treacherous, Takeo's hands began to tremble angrily and he launched himself at his wife, beating her and eventually spraining her ankle, so that she toppled to the floor. He sadistically watched her crawl downstairs, and he calmly strode downstairs after her, where he fiercely seized her hair and broke her neck and then slashed her throat.

Later that afternoon, Shunsuke Kobayashi paid a visit to the Saeki House, unwittingly becoming the first victim of the curse. As he waited impatiently for either Takeo or Kayako to arrive so he could use them to persuade Toshio to return to his school, he phoned his wife, Manami Kobayashi, to let her know he would be home later that evening. Manami, however, told her husband there was someone at the door and hung up. The man at the door turned out to be Takeo Saeki, who had just murdered his wife and son. Takeo killed Manami and sadistically ripped out her female fetus from her womb, even though it was unborn, and he then howled out in anger and pain. Takeo then stormed over to the phone box, and called Kobayashi, telling him of his suspicions that Toshio was Kobayashi's son. Takeo fiercely told Kobayashi, whom he hated, that as Toshio was his son, he could now have him instead of himself, Takeo. Takeo then revealed to Kobayashi that he had a female baby, and then proceeded to smash her fetus onto the metal poles on the street, scaring off two pedestrians, and he eventually collapsed onto some garbage bags. Eventually, Takeo saw a garbage bag moving towards him, and then he saw the corpse of Kayako who emerged from the bag and killed him in the middle of the road.

Ju-on: The Curse 2
Takeo is only seen in the apartment complex that Kobayashi and his wife lived in the first film. We see him through a ghostly flashback years later, murdering Kobayashi's wife and taking the unborn child from her body.

Ju-on: The Grudge
Once again, Takeo Saeki is the cause of all the events of Ju-on: The Grudge. It is implied that he kills anyone who steps into his house as he once again possesses someone: this time it is Katsuya Tokunaga. Katsuya develops parts of Takeo's insane personality, such as the obsession he has with the thought that Kayako has betrayed him by falling in love with Kobayashi, and his eyes change and appear more evil. Katsuya, thanks to Takeo's evil character, seems to desire the house for himself, as he kicks out Hitomi Tokunaga when she attempts to visit her brother for dinner. However, once more, he is killed by his wife, Kayako, after he has kicked out Hitomi, his sister: Katsuya, driven by Takeo, walks upstairs and enters the room under the attic, where Kayako's face appears on the window and presumably kills her evil husband once again.

An interesting sidenote is that Takeo, possessing Katsuya, seems to be affected by the evil feelings he himself has caused in the House: Katsuya, as Takeo, feels a bad emotion while standing at the foot of the stairs. This phenomenon is unexplained, because Takeo would surely be immune to the evil feelings he has caused inside the House.

Rika is suffering a huge ordeal when Kayako appears, crawling downstairs, just to make things worse for her. however, Rika notes that Kayako appears to be reaching out for help, which is a departure from Kayako's notable killings. However, when Kayako is about to kill Rika, she vanishes - presumably because she feels Takeo approaching. Takeo strides downstairs, soaked in blood, and reaches out, breaking Rika's neck, wrapping her in plastic, and finishing her off with a knife - the same way he killed his wife, Kayako.

Kayako also appears to be terrified of Takeo in this film, because this is the only film in Ju-On which shows any other side to Kayako Saeki.

Ju-on: The Grudge 2, White Ghost
These films differ from the rest of the Ju-on saga, because they are the only ones without the character of Takeo - he does not even possess a character. However, he is mentioned as part of the background story, and he is vital to the plot - because the blood stain on the floor is inevitably caused by Takeo when he murdered Kayako, as shown in a flashback in Ju-on: The Grudge 2. He appears briefly in Ju-on: White Ghost in a crumpled up family photo.

The Grudge
Takeo Saeki plays a large role in this remake. Takeo kills Kayako onscreen for the first time. He is reading her diary in her room, having found it and discovered her attraction to Peter Kirk. His hands begin to twitch madly as if he desires to get them around Kayako's throat. He then strides slowly towards her, taking his time. He launches himself angrily at her, beating her and eventually pushing her roughly away from him, causing her to sprain her ankle. Kayako then crawls downstairs, desperate to escape her violent husband. However, just as she crawls downstairs in her haste to get to the door, she looks back and discovers that Takeo is calmly walking behind her, his head high in the air. Takeo walks after his frightened wife, in a trance, and then he grabs her long black hair, and snaps her neck.

He then looks up to see his son, Toshio, watching him. Toshio has seen everything, including his mother's neck being broken, although it is unclear how much has registered with Toshio - he evidently seems frightened at seeing his father behaving this way. Takeo then grabs Toshio and drowns him in the bath, drowning Toshio's cat, Mar in the same bathtub, (who later appears to warn inhabitants of the House about the evil lurking there) and then is eventually hanged by Kayako in her room - a difference from the original film.

Aside from these events, which are shown in flashbacks, Takeo himself does not appear much in this film - except for one of the most frightening sequences in the film, when Detective Nakagawa attempts to burn down the house, and then encounters Takeo murdering Toshio. Nakagawa goes to investigate, and finds Toshio lying in the bath. He attempts to revive him, but then the evil spirit of Takeo appears suddenly behind him, and before Nakagawa can do anything but look round, Takeo angrily grabs Nakagawa's hair and shoves him into the bath, drowning him (and apparently placing his body in the attic).

In a deleted scene entitled Stop It, Takeo possesses Matthew Williams and causes Matthew to kick his sister Susan out of the House. Takeo, possessing Matthew, then ascends to Toshio's bedroom, where, from the darkness, the evil spirit of Kayako Saeki - or possibly the jawless Yoko, this is unconfirmed - appears behind him, where she presumably kills Takeo once more.

Takeo's motive for murdering Toshio is unclear in this film, although there is a suspicion that he thought Toshio was Peter Kirk's child and because he was a witness to Kayako's murder.

The Grudge 2
In this film, the plot centers, once again, around the evil curse put upon the House by Takeo. Takeo is spiritually responsible for ruining the lives of three teenage girls, Vanessa Cassidy, Miyuki Nazawa and Allison Fleming, who are all attending the Tokyo International High School in 2006, where they encounter the evil spirit of Kayako. Takeo also possesses a man named Bill Kimble, who resides in Chicago, Illinois and the possession is similar to the possession of Matthew Williams in the previous film, from the deleted scene. Bill's behavior changes and he begins to suspect his new wife, Trish, is cheating on him, as seen when he sees her on the phone to a colleague and Bill becomes so angry at this that he squeezes his car keys so fiercely that blood trickles down his hand. Later on, Takeo gets his comeuppance when Trish, who is apparently possessed by Kayako, pours oil over Bill's head, and then whacks him with her frying pan, killing Takeo once more, and causing Takeo to leave Bill's body.

Later on in the film, the evil Takeo Saeki appears. Karen's younger sister Aubrey Davis is investigating the Saeki Curse, and she returns to the House where she demands to know the motive of the grudge, and she suddenly sees her sister Karen - whom she mysteriously thinks is alive once more even though she saw her fall (presumably pushed by Kayako) off the hospital roof - ascending the stairs, looking for her boyfriend Doug. Aubrey follows her older sister, and she proceeds along the corridor to Kayako's bedroom, where she sees Takeo reading the diary. His hands once more begin to twitch as he sees Aubrey, his new victim. Once before, he strides downstairs and breaks Aubrey's neck, killing her in the same way as he killed his wife. He appears specially evil in this film, as he appears to look down at Aubrey when she is dying and smile.

Later, towards the climax of this film, Takeo appears and drown Jake Kimble's older sister Lacey in her bath, repeating Toshio's murder.

The Grudge 3
This film is one of the few which focuses on Takeo Saeki and his curse, because in the previous film he possessed Bill Kimble and invaded the Chicago apartment where the Kimbles lived. In this film, he possesses the body of Max Morrison, the brother of Lisa Morrison and the apparent landlord of the apartment. Max is possessed by Takeo. Max's behaviour changes for the worse, e.g. during the possession he neglects his younger sister Rose Morrison (apparently a repetition of the cruelty he enforced upon Toshio) even when she has severe douses of athsma, and he snaps at her several times. At one point, Takeo, (as Max) is carving strange symbols onto a window, and at another point he is carving the walls with a penknife, while a frightened Lisa encourages Rose to run for it. Lisa, Max's sister, appears to be frightened at Takeo's possession of Max, because he acts as if nothing is happening when deaths appear throughout the apartment. Takeo kicks out Lisa and she eventually seeks refuge with Kayako's sister, Naoko Kawamata. Naoko realizes that Max is possessed by Takeo's evil spirit and begins to exorcise the apartment, and banish her sister. She tells Lisa that Rose has to drink Kayako's blood, as Rose's innocence is the only thing which can stop Kayako's evil - and therefore Takeo's. However, Lisa refuses, saying Naoko hadn't told her anything about this, and just as Lisa attempts to leave, Takeo (possessing Max) gatecrashes the ceremony, and drives Naoko out into the hallway, repeating the way he attacked Kayako. Naoko, knowing who Max is, attempts to reason with him, but of course he won't listen to reason and breaks Naoko's leg, forcing her to crawl in the same manner as Kayako did. Takeo (as Max) then repeats his neck movements and produces a sharp knife, with which he thrusts it into Naoko's throat, effectively breaking her neck and killing her for good. Just then, Rose drinks Kayako's blood and Kayako vanishes, as does the grudge itself. Just then, Takeo is banished from Max's body and mind, and therefore Takeo's curse comes to an end.
However, Naoko appears afterwards as the new onryo, and kills Max, resurrecting the grudge once again.

Ju-on: The Beginning of the End, The Final Curse
Takeo is reimagined in the 2014 Japanese reboot. According to Kayako's diary, the couple had tried over the years to conceive a child, but were unable to, as revealed in the negative pregnancy results clipped to the diary. However, Kayako suddenly brought Takeo a child she claimed as their son just after their move to a new house, naming him Toshio. Takeo eventually found out from a hidden tape that Toshio was not his, but an incarnation of a boy named Toshio Yamaga residing in the house before who "entered" Kayako's womb. He already suspected this since the child did not consider Takeo his father, but was outright confirmed by Kayako's gloating of Toshio being hers only. Takeo then killed Kayako and Toshio's pet cat.

As he did not become part of Toshio's curse as Kayako did, his fate was not revealed until The Final Curse – furious, Toshio left his vessel in order to kill Takeo. With both parents gone, Toshio was taken in by Takeo's sister and her daughter, Reo.

See also
 Jack Torrance

Male horror film villains
Fictional ghosts
Fictional murderers
Fictional artists
Fictional Japanese people
Literary characters introduced in 1998
Fictional serial killers
Fictional stalkers
Ju-On characters
Fictional filicides
Fictional uxoricides
Fictional characters with spirit possession or body swapping abilities
Fictional characters who committed familicide
Characters in Japanese novels of the 20th century